My Super 8 Season (also known in French as Ma saison super 8) is a 2005 French film by Alessandro Avellis that deals with gay and lesbian issues.

Synopsis
In the early 1970s, an attractive young Parisian student, Marc, tries to organize students to fight for gay rights. Meanwhile, his best friend, Julie, becomes involved in feminist and class causes. Sparks fly when these disparate groups unite in opposition to the status quo during a heated radio show debate, leading to radical changes.

My Super 8 Season is freely inspired by the story of the FHAR, the Homosexual Revolutionary Action Front, and dedicated to its leaders Guy Hocquenghem and Françoise d'Eaubonne.

Cast
 Axel Philippon as Marc
 Célia Pilastre as Julie
 Roman Girelli as André
 Magali Domec as Marguerite
 Antoine Mory as Stéphane
 Nicolas Quilliard as Le père de Marc
 Thierry Barèges as Vincent
 Jean-Pierre Frankfower as Le professeur
 Nicolas Christin as Le flic en civil
 Nicolas Villena as L'amant de Julie
 Jean-Marc Cozic as Le commissaire
 Rivka Braun as La voisine

Festival screenings

2005
 Festival du film gay et lesbien – Paris (France)

2006
 Festival du film gay et lesbien – Brussels (Belgium)
 Da Sodoma a Hollywood – Turin (Italy)
 Vues d’en face – Grenoble (France), Journées du cinema gay – Rouen (France)
 Image+Nation – Montreal (Canada)

2007
 The New Fest  – New York (US)
 Austin Int’l G&L Film Festival – Austin (US)
 Reel Affirmations – Washington (US)
 Corona Cork Film Festival – Cork (Ireland)
 Reeling Int’l G&L Film Festival – Chicago (US)
 Mix Brasil - São Paulo, Brasília, Rio de Janeiro (Brazil)

2008
 Mix Brasil Tour 2008 (Brazil)
 Festival Désirs Désirs – Tours (France)
 Mardi Gras Film Festival – Sydney (Australia)
 London L&G Film Festival – London (UK)
 Melbourne Queer Film Festival – Melbourne (Australia)
 Outfest – Los Angeles 2008 (US)
 Q! Film Festival – Jakarta, Bali, Surabaya (Indonesia)	
 Llamale H - Uruguay Int‘l Film Festival – Montevideo 2008 (Uruguay)
 Seattle Lesbian & Gay Film Festival – Seattle 2008 (US)
 Pride Film Festival – Johannesburg, Pretoria, Durban (South Africa)	
 Florence Queer Festival – Florence 2008 (Italy)

DVD
 Antiprod 2006 (France, Belgium, Switzerland, Luxembourg)

External links

2005 films
2005 drama films
2000s French-language films
LGBT-related drama films
French drama films

2005 LGBT-related films
2000s French films